Phelsuma berghofi is a species of gecko, a lizard in the family Gekkonidae. The species is endemic to Madagascar.

Etymology
The specific name, berghofi, is in honor of German herpetologist Hans-Peter Berghof.

Geographic range
P. berghofi is native to the Atsimo-Atsinanana region of southeastern Madagascar.

Habitat

Description

Reproduction
P. berghofi is oviparous.

References

Further reading
Berghof H-P (2005). Taggeckos. Münster, Germany: Natur und Tier Verlag. 144 pp. (Phelsuma berghofi, p. 111). (in German).
Hallmann G, Krüger J, Trautmann G (2008). Faszinierende Taggeckos: Die Gattung Phelsuma. Münster, Germany: Natur und Tier Verlag. 253 pp. . (Phelsuma berghofi, p. 88). (in German). 
Krüger J (1996). "Beschreibung einer neuen Art aus der Gattung Phelsuma aus dem Süd-Osten Madagaskars ". Herpetofauna 18 (105): 14–18. (Phelsuma berghofi, new species). (in German).
Rösler H (2000). "Kommentierte Liste der rezent, subrezent und fossil bekannten Geckotaxa (Reptilia: Gekkonomorpha)". Gekkota 2: 28–153. (Phelsuma berghofi, p. 101). (in German).

Phelsuma
Endemic fauna of Madagascar
Reptiles of Madagascar
Reptiles described in 1996